Willem Caland (August 27, 1859, Brielle – March 23, 1932, Utrecht) was a Dutch Indologist. He studied in Leiden and graduated in 1882.

In 1897 he became member of the Royal Netherlands Academy of Arts and Sciences.

In Indo-European studies, the term "Caland system" is named after him.

References

W. Caland, Kleine Schriften... Hrsg. M. Witzel (Wiesbaden, 1990).
Biography in Dutch
Jeremy Rau, "The Indo-Iranian Caland System"

1859 births
1932 deaths
Dutch Indologists
Members of the Royal Netherlands Academy of Arts and Sciences
People from Brielle